Athos Schwantes (born 13 February 1985) is a Brazilian fencer.
At the 2012 Summer Olympics he competed in the Men's épée, but was defeated in the first round. He also competed at the 2016 Summer Olympics in Rio de Janeiro, where he beat Czech Jiří Beran in the first round, but lost in the second round to the French Gauthier Grumier, who was the first seed.

References

Living people
1985 births
Brazilian male épée fencers
Sportspeople from Curitiba
Olympic fencers of Brazil
Fencers at the 2012 Summer Olympics
Fencers at the 2016 Summer Olympics
South American Games bronze medalists for Brazil
South American Games medalists in fencing
Competitors at the 2010 South American Games
Fencers at the 2019 Pan American Games
Pan American Games competitors for Brazil
Fencers at the 2015 Pan American Games
21st-century Brazilian people